Museum card may refer to:

Museum card (Finland)
Museumkaart, in the Netherlands